Robert Tubman (6 June 1884 – 17 December 1956) was a pioneer Australian rugby league footballer, one of his country's first selected national representatives.

Playing career
Tubman was a registered rugby union player in Queensland in 1908 at the time of the rugby league code's inaugural competition year in Australia. He was selected in the first ever Queensland Maroons state representative side to play the new "Northern Union" style of rugby, taking on Albert Baskerville's New Zealand All Golds on their inaugural tour. He would go to make fourteen state appearances over the next three years against New Zealand, New South Wales, Great Britain and the New Zealand Māori rugby league team.

When the New Zealand team came back on the return leg of their tour, they played three Test matches against the first Australian representative sides ever selected. The first Test was played in Sydney on 9 May 1908 with the Kiwis prevailing. Tubman played in that Test at prop-forward and has been allocated Kangaroo representative No. 14. Tubman and his Queensland former rugby union colleagues Micky Dore and Doug McLean snr were all disqualified by the Queensland Rugby Union within days.

During the 1910 Ashes series played in Australia, Tubman made his 2nd and final national representative appearance in the second-row.

References

Footnotes

Sources
 Whiticker, Alan & Hudson, Glen (2006) The Encyclopedia of Rugby League Players, Gavin Allen Publishing, Sydney

Australian rugby league players
Queensland rugby league team players
Australia national rugby league team players
1884 births
1956 deaths
Australian rugby union players